"Bang-A-Boomerang" is a song by ABBA, first released by Svenne & Lotta (both Swedish and English-language versions). The track was first recorded as a demo with English lyrics (but without any recorded vocals) in September 1974 by the ABBA musicians for their eponymous album ABBA. The song was written by Benny Andersson, Björn Ulvaeus and Stig Anderson and at one point had the working title "Stop and Listen to Your Heart". The lyrics compare the "message of love" with the returning boomerangs which the Australian Aborigines developed.

History 
In late 1974 Andersson, Ulvaeus and Anderson were invited by Sveriges Television as composers to submit a song to the 1975 Melodifestivalen. Since ABBA themselves did not want to compete in the contest again, just one year after having won, they instead gave the opportunity and the song to Polar Music labelmates Svenne & Lotta. "Bang-A-Boomerang" was given new Swedish lyrics by Stig Anderson and retitled "Bang en Boomerang" and the duo subsequently made a vocal recording of the track in November 1974—produced by Björn & Benny—with a different arrangement, most noticeably slightly shorter (2:50) than the original demo, to fit the Eurovision three-minute rule. The song finished third in the Swedish preselections in February 1975, became one of Svenne & Lotta's biggest hits and spent seven weeks on the Svensktoppen radio chart during the period 9 March – 11 May 1975, with a second place as best result. Svenne & Lotta also recorded the song with the original English lyrics, both versions were included on their 1975 album Svenne & Lotta/2 (Polar POLS 259). The English version was also released as a single in Denmark and became a big seller there, from a Scandinavian perspective the track is therefore still primarily seen as a hit single and Melodifestivalen classic by Svenne & Lotta. Under the name of "Sven & Charlotte", their original English version was also released in most European countries, and in Oceania, charting in several.

ABBA then re-recorded their English-language version of the song in the Spring of 1975, using the Svenne & Lotta backing track—reputedly to the surprise of the duo, included it on their ABBA album and later also released it as a single in France on 21 April 1975, with "SOS" as B-side, where it was a minor hit. Although the track was included on the band's first Greatest Hits album, released on 17 November 1975, the ABBA version was in fact never issued as a single in Scandinavia.

Track listing

Svenne & Lotta's version

English version

Swedish version

ABBA's version

Other cover versions, appearances in other media etc.
 Danish singer Ulla Pia covered the song in her native language.
 Swedish band Noice recorded the song on their 1981 album Det ljuva livet.
 In 1998 the Swedish heavy metal group Black Ingvars covered the song, in a heavy metal version for their album Schlager Metal.
 In the year 2000, the Swedish dansband Lotta Engbergs recorded a cover version on the Swedish-language version of the song, on their album "Vilken härlig dag", and the song is also on Swedish dansband singer Lotta Engberg's 2006 compilation album "Världens bästa lotta".
 A hi-NRG/eurodance cover of the song by Les Blue Belles was released as a single in 2002 and included on various dance compilations.
 In 2007 producer Leonard T. released a song called "Go" (featuring vocals from Maia Lee), the song uses the same melody as "Bang-A-Boomerang" but different lyrics.
 A dance/pop cover in Swedish was recorded by modern schlager music artists the Banana Girls.
 A German language cover was released as a single in 1975 by the trio Milan, Paul & Ela under the title "Sing, wenn du mal traurig bist" with the German lyrics provided by Gerd Thumser. This song was later covered by Nico Gaik for the album Musicalstars sing ABBA.
 Danish duo Olsen Brothers (winners of the Eurovision contest in 2000) covered the song on their 2010 album Wings of Eurovision.
 This song appears in ABBA: You Can Dance.
 Performed by Afro-dite as an interval act during Heat 3 of Melodifestivalen 2023.

Chart positions
 Svenne & Lotta's version

External links
 ABBA - for the record - Collector site and discography.

References

1975 singles
1975 songs
ABBA songs
Male–female vocal duets
Melodifestivalen songs of 1975
Music videos directed by Lasse Hallström
Songs written by Benny Andersson and Björn Ulvaeus
Songs written by Stig Anderson
Svenne & Lotta songs